Tuvan or Tyvan (Tuvan: , tıva dıl) is a Turkic language spoken in the Republic of Tuva in South-Central Siberia in Russia. The language has borrowed a great number of roots from the Mongolian language, Tibetan and the Russian language. There are small diaspora groups of Tuvan people that speak distinct dialects of Tuvan in the People's Republic of China and in Mongolia.

History 
While this history focuses on mostly the people of Tuva, many linguists argue that language is inevitably intertwined with the socio-historical situation of a language itself. The earliest record of Tuvan is from the early 19th century by Wūlǐyǎsūtái zhìlüè, Julius Klaproth 1823, Matthias Castrén 1857, Katanov and Vasily Radlov, etc.

The name Tuva goes back as early as the publication of The Secret History of the Mongols. The Tuva (as they refer to themselves) have historically been referred to as Soyons, Soyots or Uriankhais. The Tuvan people have been ruled by China, Russia and Mongolia for thousands of years. Their most recent time of independence was from 1921 to 1944, when they were considered the Tuvan's People's Republic.

Many sources say there has been extreme tension between the Soviet Union/Russian Federation government and leaders in the Tuvan nation since 1944, when Tuva lost its independence to the Soviets. In 1990, violence broke out between Tuvans and the Russian government. According to a study completed by social scientists Louk Hagendoorn, Edwin Poppe and Anca Minescu in 2008, the Tuvan people wanted to be as independent as possible from the Russian Federation following the collapse of the Soviet Union. They especially emphasized their want for independence in terms of their language and culture. The study demonstrates that the reason behind this was partially based on prejudice. The many minority ethnic and linguistic groups in Russia compete for economic resources and hold closely on to their individual identities by emphasizing the importance of language and culture.

Since 2000, the Russian Federation has been trying to reduce separatist tendencies of ethnic minorities in Russia, but the tendencies persist.

Classification 
Tuvan (also spelled Tyvan) is linguistically classified as a Northeastern or Siberian Turkic language, closely related to several other Siberian Turkic languages including Khakas and Altai. Its closest relative is the moribund Tofa.

Tuvan, as spoken in Tuva, is principally divided into four dialect groups; Western, Central, Northeastern, Southeastern.
 Central: forms the basis of the literary language and includes Ovyur and Bii-Khem subdialects. The geographical centrality of this dialect meant it was similar to the language spoken by most Tuvans, whether or not exactly the same.
 Western: can be found spoken near the upper course of the Khemchik. It is influenced by the Altai language.
 Northeastern, also known as the Todzhi dialect, is spoken near the upper course of the Great Yenisey. The speakers of this dialect utilize nasalization. It contains a large vocabulary related to hunting and reindeer breeding not found in the other dialects.
 Southeastern: shows the most influence from the Mongolic languages.

Other dialects include those spoken by the Dzungar, the Tsengel and the Dukha Tuvans, but currently these uncommon dialects are not comprehensively documented. Different dialects of the language exist across the geographic region in which Tuvan is spoken. K. David Harrison, who completed his dissertation on the Tuvan language in 2001, argues that the divergence of these dialects relates to the nomadic nature of the Tuvan nation. One subset is the Jungar Tuvan language, originating in the Altai Mountains in the western region of Mongolia. There is no accurate number of Jungar-Tuvan speakers because most currently reside in China, and the Chinese include Tuvan speakers as Mongolians in their census.

Phonology

Consonants 
Tuvan has 19 native consonant phonemes:

Vowels 
Vowels in Tuvan exist in three varieties: short, long and short with low pitch. Tuvan long vowels have a duration that is at least (and often more than) twice as long as that of short vowels. Contrastive low pitch may occur on short vowels, and when it does, it causes them to increase in duration by at least a half. When using low pitch, Tuvan-speakers employ a pitch that is at the very low end of their modal voice pitch. For some speakers, it is even lower and using what is phonetically known as creaky voice. When a vowel in a monosyllabic word has low pitch, speakers apply low pitch only to the first half of that vowel (e.g.  'horse'). That is followed by a noticeable pitch rise, as the speaker returns to modal pitch in the second half of the vowel.

The acoustic impression is similar to that of a rising tone like the rising pitch contour of the Mandarin second tone, but the Tuvan pitch begins much lower. However, Tuvan is considered a pitch accent language with contrastive low pitch instead of a tonal language. When the low pitch vowel occurs in a multisyllabic word, there is no rising pitch contour or lengthening effect:  'his/her/its horse'. Such low pitch vowels were previously referred to in the literature as either kargyraa or pharyngealized vowels. Phonetic studies have demonstrated that the defining characteristic of such vowels is low pitch. See Harrison 2001 for a phonetic and acoustic study of Tuvan low pitch vowels.

In her PhD thesis, "Long Vowels in Mongolic Loanwords in Tuvan", Baiarma Khabtagaeva states that the history of long vowels is ambiguous. While the long vowels may originate from Mongolic languages, they could also be of Tuvan origin. In most Mongolic languages, the quality of the long vowel changes depending on the quality of the second vowel in the conjunction. The only exception to this rule is if the conjunction is labial. The ancient Tuvan languages, in contrast, depended upon the first vowel rather than the second to determine the long vowels.

Khabtagaeva divided the transformation of these loanwords into two periods: the early layer and the late layer. The words in the early layer are words in which the Mongolic preserved the conjunction, the VCV conjunction was preserved but the long vowel still developed when it entered the Tuvan language, or the stress is on the last syllable and a long vowel in the loanword replaced a short vowel in the original word. The Late Layer includes loanwords in which the long vowel does not change when the word entered Tuvan.

Vowels may also be nasalized in the environment of nasal consonants, but nasalization is non-contrastive. Most Tuvan vowels in word-initial syllables have a low pitch and do not contrast significantly with short and long vowels.

Vowel harmony 

Tuvan has two systems of vowel harmony that strictly govern the distribution of vowels within words and suffixes. Backness harmony, or what is sometimes called 'palatal' harmony, requires all vowels within a word to be either back or front. Rounding harmony, or what is sometimes called 'labial' harmony, requires a vowel to be rounded if it is a high vowel and appears in a syllable immediately following a rounded vowel. Low rounded vowels  are restricted to the first syllable of a word, and a vowel in a non-initial syllable may be rounded only if it meets the conditions of rounding harmony (it must both be a high vowel  and be preceded by a rounded vowel). See Harrison (2001) for a detailed description of Tuvan vowel harmony systems.

Grammar 
Tuvan builds morphologically complex words by adding suffixes. For example,  teve is 'camel',  teveler is 'camels',  tevelerim is 'my camels',  tevelerimden is 'from my camels'.

Nouns 
Tuvan marks nouns with six cases: genitive, accusative, dative, ablative, locative, and allative. The suffixes below are in front vowels, however, except -Je the suffixes follow vowel harmony rules. Each case suffix has a rich variety of uses and meanings, only the most basic uses and meanings are shown here.

Verbs 
Verbs in Tuvan take a number of endings to mark tense, mood, and aspect. Auxiliary verbs are also used to modify the verb. For a detailed scholarly study of auxiliary verbs in Tuvan and related languages, see Anderson 2004.

Syntax 
Tuvan employs SOV word order. For example,  (camel hay eat-PAST) "The camel ate the hay."

Vocabulary 

Tuvan vocabulary is mostly Turkic in origin but marked by a large number of Mongolian loanwords.  The language has also borrowed several Mongolian suffixes. In addition, there exist Ketic and Samoyedic substrata. A Tuvan talking dictionary is produced by the Living Tongues Institute.

In contrast with most Turkic languages, which have many Arabic and Persian loanwords that even cover some basic concepts, these loanwords are very few in Tuvan, if any, as Tuvans never adopted Islam like most Turkic peoples.

Writing system

Cyrillic script 
The current Tuvan alphabet is a modified version of the Russian alphabet, with three additional letters: ң (Latin "ng" or International Phonetic Alphabet ), Өө (Latin "ö"), Үү (Latin "ü", IPA ). The sequence of the alphabet follows Russian exactly, with ң located after Russian Н, Ө after О, and Ү after У.

The letters Е and Э are used in a special way.  Э is used for the short  sound at the beginning of words while Е is used for the same sound in the middle and at the end of words.  Е is used at the beginning of words, mostly of Russian origin, to reflect the standard Russian pronunciation of that letter, . Additionally, ЭЭ is used in the middle and at the end of words for the long  sound.

The letter ъ is used to indicate pitch accent, as in эът èt 'meat'.

Historic scripts

Mongol script 
In the past, Tuvans used Mongolian as their written language.

Mongolian script was later developed by Nikolaus Poppe to suit the Tuvan language. This is the first known written form of the Tuvan language.

Tuvan Latin 

The Latin-based alphabet for Tuvan was devised in 1930 by a Tuvan Buddhist monk, Mongush Lopsang-Chinmit (a.k.a. Lubsan Zhigmed).  A few books and newspapers, including primers intended to teach adults to read, were printed using this writing system. Lopsang-Chinmit was later executed in Stalinist purges on 31 December 1941.

The letter Ɉ ɉ was excluded from the alphabet in 1931.

Examples

By September 1943, this Latin-based alphabet was replaced by a Cyrillic-based one, which is still in use to the present day. In the post-Soviet era, Tuvan and other scholars have taken a renewed interest in the history of Tuvan letters.

Transliteration 
For bibliographic purposes, transliteration of Tuvan generally follows the guidelines described in the ALA-LC Romanization tables for non-Slavic languages in Cyrillic script. Linguistic descriptions often employ the IPA or Turcological standards for transliteration.

Status 
Tuvans in China, who live mostly in Xinjiang Autonomous Region, are included under the Mongol nationality. Some Tuvans reportedly live at Kanas Lake in the northwestern part of Xinjiang, where they are not officially recognized, and are counted as a part of the local Oirat Mongol community that is counted under the general PRC official ethnic label of "Mongol". Oirat and Tuvan children attend schools in which they use Chakhar Mongolian and Standard Chinese, native languages of neither group.

Notes

References 
 
 
 
 
 
 
 Mawkanuli, Talant.  1999.  "The phonology and morphology of Jungar Tuva," Indiana University PhD dissertation.
 
 Nakashima, Yoshiteru (中嶋 善輝 Nakashima Yoshiteru). 2008 "Tyva Yapon Biche Slovar', トゥヴァ語・日本語 小辞典" Tokyo University of Foreign Studies, http://www.aa.tufs.ac.jp/project/gengokensyu/08tuvan6.pdf (Archive)
Ölmez, Mehmet; Tuwinischer Wortschatz mit alttürkischen und mongolischen Parallelen, Wiesbaden 2007, 
Rind-Pawloski, Monika. 2014. Text types and evidentiality in Dzungar Tuvan. Turkic Languages 18.1: 159–188.
 Sečenbaγatur, Qasgerel, Tuyaγ-a [Туяa], Bu. Jirannige, Wu Yingzhe, Činggeltei. 2005. Mongγul kelen-ü nutuγ-un ayalγun-u sinǰilel-ün uduridqal  [A guide to the regional dialects of Mongolian]. Kökeqota: ÖMAKQ. .
 Takashima, Naoki (高島 尚生 Takashima Naoki). 2008 "Kiso Tuba-go bunpō 基礎トゥヴァ語文法," Tokyo University of Foreign Studies, http://www.aa.tufs.ac.jp/project/gengokensyu/08tuvan1.pdf (Archive)
 Takashima, Naoki. 2008 "Tuba-go kaiwa-shū トゥヴァ語会話集," Tokyo University of Foreign Studies, http://www.aa.tufs.ac.jp/project/gengokensyu/08tuvan3.pdf (Archive)
 Taube, Erika. (1978). Tuwinische Volksmärchen. Berlin: Akademie-Verlag. LCCN: 83-853915
 Taube, Erika. (1994). Skazki i predaniia altaiskikh tuvintsev. Moskva : Vostochnaia literatura. 
 Todoriki, Masahiko (等々力 政彦 Todoriki Masahiko). 2011 "Possibly the oldest Tuvan vocabulary included in Wu-li-ya-su-tai-zhi lue, the Abridged Copy of the History of Uliastai, 烏里蘇台志略にみえる，最古の可能性のあるトゥバ語語彙について". Tōyōbunka-Kenkyūjo Kiyō 東洋文化研究所紀要 159 238–220.  The University of Tokyo, http://repository.dl.itc.u-tokyo.ac.jp/dspace/bitstream/2261/43632/1/ioc159007.pdf (Archive)
 Oelschlägel, Anett C. (2013). Der Taigageist. Berichte und Geschichten von Menschen und Geistern aus Tuwa. Zeitgenössische Sagen und andere Folkloretexte / Дух-хозяин тайги –Современные предания и другие фольклорные материалы из Тувы / Тайга ээзи – Болган таварылгалар болгаш Тывадан чыгдынган аас чогаалының өске-даа материалдары. [The Taiga Spirit. Reports and Stories about People and Spirits from Tuva. Contemporary Legends and other Folklore-Texts.] Marburg: tectum-Verlag.

External links 

 Tuvan language and folklore materials

Agglutinative languages
Siberian Turkic languages
Languages of Russia
Languages of China
Languages of Mongolia
Tonal languages in non-tonal families
Tuvan culture
Turkic languages
Vulnerable languages